Dževad Šećerbegović (born 15 July 1955) is a Bosnian retired footballer who played for SFR Yugoslavia.

Club career
Born in Gornji Rahić, Brčko, Šećerbegović spent most of his football career playing for local side FK Sloboda Tuzla. At the end of his career, he moved to Turkey and signed with Beşiktaş J.K. for two seasons.

International career
Šećerbegović made his debut for Yugoslavia in a January 1977 friendly match away against Colombia and has earned a total of 9 caps, scoring no goals. He also played for the Yugoslavia squad that finished fourth at the 1980 Summer Olympics in Moscow. His final international was an April 1983 friendly against France.

References

External links

 
 
 
 EX YU Fudbalska Statistika po godinama
 

1955 births
Living people
People from Brčko District
Association football wingers
Yugoslav footballers
Bosnia and Herzegovina footballers
Yugoslavia international footballers
Olympic footballers of Yugoslavia
Footballers at the 1980 Summer Olympics
FK Sloboda Tuzla players
Beşiktaş J.K. footballers
Yugoslav First League players
Süper Lig players
Yugoslav expatriate footballers
Expatriate footballers in Turkey
Yugoslav expatriate sportspeople in Turkey